"Telling Me Lies" is a song written by Linda Thompson and Betsy Cook, which was included on Thompson's 1985 One Clear Moment album (her first solo album, after divorcing husband and former collaborator Richard Thompson).  A more famous recording of the song, however, was Linda Ronstadt, Dolly Parton and Emmylou Harris's version, which they included on their 1987 collaboration Trio.  The song was also released as the album's second single, and it reached the top ten on the U.S. country singles charts in the fall of 1987.  Parton, Ronstadt and Harris' recording of the song was nominated for a Grammy award in 1988 for Country Song of the Year.

Chart positions

External links
Telling Me Lies lyrics at Dolly Parton On-Line

1985 songs
1987 singles
Dolly Parton songs
Linda Ronstadt songs
Emmylou Harris songs
Songs written by Linda Thompson (singer)
Warner Records singles
Songs written by Betsy Cook